An ataractive is a type of drug which diminishes hallucinations in patients exhibiting them.

Examples include azacyclonol and atypical antipsychotics.

See also 
 Antipsychotic
 Tranquilizer

References 

Antipsychotics